Cthulhu macrofasciculumque is a species of excavates. It lives in the guts of termites.

Habitat 
It lives in the hindgut of Prorhinotermes simplex (Cuban subterranean termite) and helps them to digest wood.

Appearance 
The microbe's length is about a fifth of the width of a human hair, in the range of 10 to 20 µm, and it has around 20 flagella. Cthylla is slightly smaller, with only five flagella.

Naming 
The octopus-like movements and appearance of Cthulhu macrofasciculumque (as well as another protist that assists in the digestion of wood by termites) reminded researcher Erick James of Cthulhu, H. P. Lovecraft's fictional cosmic entity.  James named the other protist, Cthylla microfasciculumque, after Cthulhu's "daughter" Cthylla.

See also
Eastern subterranean termite

References 

Metamonads
Cthulhu Mythos